The  was a class of minelayers of the Imperial Japanese Navy (IJN), serving during and after World War II. The class consists of three subclasses, which this article handles collectively.

Background
In 1937, the IJN planned this class as a replacement for the timeworn Natsushima and the Sokuten-class auxiliary minelayer.

Ships in classes

Sokuten class
Project number H11. Original model of the Sokuten class. Five vessels were built in 1937–40 under the Maru 3 Programme (Ship # 57–61).

Hirashima class
Project number H11B. Second production model of the Sokuten-class. Nine vessels were built in 1939–43 under the Maru 4 Programme (Ship # 170–178). They were equipped with a 76.2 mm anti-aircraft gun. The Nuwajima had its ballast tank replaced with a fuel tank for convoy escort operations. These nine vessels were classed in the Sokuten-class in the IJN official documents.

Ajiro class
Project number H13 at first. The IJN hoped urgent building for her. The Navy Technical Department revised the Hirashima drawings. Twenty-six vessels were planned under the Maru Kyū Programme (Ship # 460–473, 14 vessels) and the Kai-Maru 5 Programme (Ship # 5421–5432, 12 vessels), but only Ajiro was completed. The Ajiro-class were classified separately from the Sokuten-class in the IJN official documents.

Footnotes

Bibliography 
 , History of Pacific War Vol.51, The truth histories of the Imperial Japanese Vessels Part.2, Gakken (Japan), June 2002, 
 Ships of the World special issue Vol.45, Escort Vessels of the Imperial Japanese Navy, (Japan), February 1996
 Model Art Extra No.340, Drawings of Imperial Japanese Naval Vessels Part-1,  (Japan), October 1989
 The Maru Special, Japanese Naval Vessels No.47, Japanese naval mine warfare crafts,  (Japan), January 1981
 Daiji Katagiri, Ship Name Chronicles of the Imperial Japanese Navy Combined Fleet, Kōjinsha (Japan), June 1988, 
 Senshi Sōsho Vol.31, Naval armaments and war preparation (1), "Until November 1941", Asagumo Simbun (Japan), November 1969
 Senshi Sōsho Vol.88, Naval armaments and war preparation (2), "And after the outbreak of war", Asagumo Simbun (Japan), October 1975